King Branch is a stream in western Polk County in the U.S. state of Missouri. It is a tributary of Turkey Creek.

King Branch has the name of the local King family.

See also
List of rivers of Missouri

References

Rivers of Polk County, Missouri
Rivers of Missouri